The 1995–96 Women's EHF Cup was the 15th edition of the competition, running from 7 October 1994 to 12 May 1996. Defending champion Debreceni VSC defeated Larvik HK in the final, again on away goals, to become the first club to win the competition twice. CB Amadeo Tortajada and Istochnik Rostov also reached the semifinals.

Qualifying round

Round of 16

Quarter-finals

Semifinals

Final

References

Women's EHF Cup
EHF Women's Cup
EHF Women's Cup